Profit Over People: Neoliberalism and Global Order is a 1999 book by Noam Chomsky, published by Seven Stories Press. It contains his critique of neoliberalism.

Overview
Chomsky argues that the doctrines and development of a pro-corporate system, consisting of economic and political policies that restrict the public arena and support private power, acts essentially as a social hierarchy which places the drive for profit over the wider needs of the population. Moreover, Chomsky also indicates the harmful effects of policies that are prescribed to poor countries from institutions such as the International Monetary Fund, World Trade Organization and the World Bank.

See also
 Classical liberalism
 Economic development
 Globalisation
 Multilateral Agreement on Investment
 North American Free Trade Agreement
 Washington Consensus

References

External links
 Profit Over People: Neoliberalism and Global Order PDF
 Profit Over People: Neoliberalism and Global Order MOBI
 Profit Over People: Neoliberalism and Global Order EPUB
 A New Generation Draws the Line: Kosovo, East Timor and the Standards of the West
 Rogue States: The Rule of Force in World Affairs
 Latin America: From Colonization to Globalization

1999 non-fiction books
Books about globalization
Books about multinational companies
Books by Noam Chomsky
Seven Stories Press books